Sancheti is a surname. Notable people with the surname include:

 Ajay Sancheti (born 1965), Indian politician 
 Chainsukh Madanlal Sancheti (born 1953), Indian politician 
 Kantilal Hastimal Sancheti (born 1936), Indian orthopedic physician

Indian surnames